Homer Se (born May 5, 1977) is a Filipino former professional basketball player of the Philippine Basketball Association (PBA).

Player profile
Se is a tough, physical, and aggressive player who never backs down. He is known for collecting excessive technical fouls due to his rough playing style. In 2008, he was ejected from a match with the Singapore Slingers for kicking opposing player Eric Sandrin in the head in response to Sandrin's trash-talking.

The 6-6 former stalwart of San Sebastian College - Recoletos failed to continue the Stags’ reign in the NCAA after his team lost to the Letran Knights.

He then join the Metropolitan Basketball Association, but the league was on its last remaining years before closing down permanently. After his short stint in the MBA, he then went to the Philippine Basketball Association and was picked by Red Bull as the 5th overall in 2002. He won a championship with Red Bull after being traded to Air21.

He was then traded to Ginebra alongside Cyrus Baguio in exchange for 2012 and 2013 future picks. At the end of the 2009 PBA Fiesta Conference, he was waived by the Gin Kings.

Se played for the Shopinas.com Clickers in an attempt to return to the PBA, but due to an injury, he had to retire once more.

References

1977 births
Living people
Air21 Express players
Barako Bull Energy Boosters players
Barako Bull Energy players
Barangay Ginebra San Miguel players
Basketball players from Albay
Bicolano people
Centers (basketball)
Filipino men's basketball players
Filipino people of Chinese descent
San Sebastian Stags basketball players
People from Albay
Power forwards (basketball)
Barako Bull Energy Boosters draft picks